von Adelebsen is the name of a German noble family, which belongs to the medieval nobility (German: Uradel) originating from Göttingen.

History 

The family originated in Wibbecke near Göttingen, leading to the family's former name von Wibbecke. In the 1200s, they moved to Adelebsen castle on the banks of the Schwülme river and changed their name to von Adelebsen.

After the death of Georg Freiherr von Adelebsen in 1957, the family ceased to exist.

Notable family members 

 Reinhard von Adelebsen (1826–1883): estate owner and member of the German parliament.

References 

German noble families